Stock-taking or "inventory checking" or "wall-to-wall" is the physical verification of the quantities and condition of items held in an inventory or warehouse. This may be done to provide an audit of existing stock. It is also the source of stock discrepancy information.

Stock-taking may be performed as an intensive annual, end of fiscal year, procedure or may be done continuously by means of a cycle count. An annual end of fiscal year stock-taking is typically undertaken for use in a company's financial statements. It is often done in the presence of the external auditors who are auditing the financial statements.

Periodic counting is usually undertaken for regular, inexpensive items. The term "periodic" may refer to annual stock count. However, "periodic" may also refer to half yearly, seasonal, quarterly, monthly, bi-monthly or daily. For expensive items a shorter period of stock-taking is preferred.

A stock-take sale is a sale with reduced prices in a shop designed to sell off stock from previous seasons. This makes the task of stock-taking easier.

Another purpose of stock take is determination of a cutoff point i.e. what was the stock position of the company/organization at a specific point of time.

However, such stock-taking tasks are often laborious and often lead to significant warehouse operational downtime, ranging from days to weeks.

References

See also
 Physical inventory

Inventory
Asset lists